National Highway 785, commonly referred to as NH 785 is a national highway in India. It is a spur road of National Highway 85.  NH-785 traverses the state of Tamil Nadu in India.

Route 
NH785 connects Madurai, Naganagulam, Ayyar, Bungalow, Oomachikulam, Vembarali, Vathipatti, Chatthirapatti, Chinnapatti, Nattam and Tovarankurichchi.

Junctions  

  Terminal near Madurai.
  near Natham
  Terminal near Tovarankurichchi.

See also 

 List of National Highways in India
 List of National Highways in India by state

References

External links 

 NH 785 on OpenStreetMap

National highways in India
National Highways in Tamil Nadu